Defending champion Ivan Lendl defeated Miloslav Mečíř in the final, 6–4, 6–2, 6–0 to win the men's singles tennis title at the 1986 US Open.

This was the first major in which future eight-time major champion Andre Agassi competed in the main draw. He would go on to play an Open Era record 21 consecutive US Open tournaments.

This was the first US Open in history where no American man reached the semifinals.

Seeds
The seeded players are listed below. Ivan Lendl is the champion; others show the round in which they were eliminated.

  Ivan Lendl (champion)
  Mats Wilander (fourth round)
  Boris Becker (semifinalist)
  Stefan Edberg (semifinalist)
  Yannick Noah (third round)
  Jimmy Connors (third round)
  Joakim Nyström (quarterfinalist)
  Henri Leconte (quarterfinalist)
  John McEnroe (first round)
  Andrés Gómez (second round)
  Mikael Pernfors (second round)
  Thierry Tulasne (first round)
  Anders Järryd (third round)
  Tim Mayotte (first round)
  Brad Gilbert (fourth round)
  Miloslav Mečíř (finalist)

Draw

Finals

Top half

Section 1

Section 2

Section 3

Section 4

Bottom half

Section 5

Section 6

Section 7

Section 8

References

External links
 Association of Tennis Professionals (ATP) – 1986 US Open Men's Singles draw
1986 US Open – Men's draws and results at the International Tennis Federation

Men's singles
US Open (tennis) by year – Men's singles